Mark Holata (born August 25, 1982) is an American former mixed martial artist. A professional from 2007 until 2014, he is best known for his appearances in Bellator.

Background
Holata was born in Claremore, Oklahoma and raised in Morris, Oklahoma, attending Morris High School. At Morris, Holata competed in football, and was talented, earning four letters and winning multiple All-State selections including as a punter, as well as being named his district's Offensive Player of the Year as a senior. In addition to football, Holata also received four letters in powerlifting, All-State honors three times, won the state title, and also lettered one year in track and field. Holata continued his football career for the University of Tulsa.

Mixed martial arts career

Early career
Holata made his professional MMA debut in June 2007.  During the first three years of his career, he amassed a record of 8-2.

Bellator
Holata made his Bellator debut at Bellator 31, where he defeated Shawn Jordan by way of first-round knockout.

In 2011, Holata returned at Bellator 42, where he defeated Tracy Willis by way of first-round submission. At Bellator 52 Holata lost by first-round knockout to Ron Sparks in a quarterfinal of the Bellator Season Five Heavyweight Tournament.

Holata rebounded from the loss by defeating Abe Wagner by first-round submission at Bellator 69.

At Bellator 75 Holata lost by first-round submission to Vinicius Queiroz in a quarterfinal of the Bellator Season Seven Heavyweight Tournament.

In March 2014, Holata returned to Bellator. He faced Alexander Volkov in the opening round of the Bellator Season 10 Heavyweight tournament at Bellator 111 on March 7, 2014. He lost the fight via TKO in the first round.

Mixed martial arts record

|-
|Loss
|align=center|12–5
|Alexander Volkov
|TKO (punches)
|Bellator 111
|
|align=center|1
|align=center|1:21
|Thackerville, Oklahoma, United States
|
|-
| Loss
|align=center| 12–4
|Vinicius Queiroz
|Submission (armbar)
|Bellator 75
|
|align=center| 1
|align=center| 3:26
|Hammond, Indiana, United States
|
|-
| Win
|align=center| 12–3
|Abe Wagner
|Submission (achilles lock)
|Bellator 69
|
|align=center| 1
|align=center| 2:24
|Lake Charles, Louisiana, United States
|
|-
| Loss
|align=center| 11–3
|Ron Sparks
|KO (punches)
|Bellator 52
|
|align=center| 1
|align=center| 1:24
|Lake Charles, Louisiana, United States
|
|-
| Win
|align=center| 11–2
|Tracy Willis
|Submission (knees and punches)
|Bellator 42
|
|align=center| 1
|align=center| 0:49
|Concho, Oklahoma, United States
|
|-
| Win
|align=center| 10–2
|Carmelo Marrero
|Decision (unanimous)
|C3 Fights: SlamFest
|
|align=center| 3
|align=center| 5:00
|Newkirk, Oklahoma, United States
|
|-
| Win
|align=center| 9–2
|Shawn Jordan
|KO (punch)
|Bellator 31
|
|align=center| 1
|align=center| 1:13
|Lake Charles, Louisiana, United States
| 
|-
| Win
|align=center| 8–2
|James Jack
|Decision (unanimous)
|C3 Fights: Knockout-Rockout Weekend 3
|
|align=center| 3
|align=center| 3:00
|Concho, Oklahoma, United States
| 
|-
| Win
|align=center| 7–2
|Jason Nicholsen
|Submission (rear-naked choke)
|C3 Fights: Knockout-Rockout Weekend 2
|
|align=center| 1
|align=center| 2:09
|Clinton, Oklahoma, United States
|
|-
| Win
|align=center| 6–2
|Joel Traves
|Decision (unanimous)
|C3 Fights: Slammin Jammin Weekend 4
|
|align=center| 3
|align=center| 3:00
|Newkirk, Oklahoma, United States
|
|-
| Win
|align=center| 5–2
|Ralph Kelly
|TKO (retirement)
|C3 Fights: Slammin Jammin Weekend 2
|
|align=center| 1
|align=center| 3:00
|Red Rock, Oklahoma, United States
| 
|-
| Win
|align=center| 4–2
|John Hill
|Submission (rear-naked choke)
|Bricktown Brawl 1
|
|align=center| 2
|align=center| 1:19
|Oklahoma City, Oklahoma, United States
| 
|-
| Loss
|align=center| 3–2
|Darrill Schoonover
|TKO (punches)
|Freestyle Cage Fighting 23
|
|align=center| 1
|align=center| 2:33
|Oklahoma City, Oklahoma, United States
| 
|-
| Loss
|align=center| 3–1
|John Orr
|TKO (strikes)
|C3 Fights: Battle on the Border
|
|align=center| 2
|align=center| 1:48
|Newkirk, Oklahoma, United States
| 
|-
| Win
|align=center| 3–0
|Danny Howell
|TKO (punches)
|Masters of the Cage 17
| 
|align=center| 1
|align=center| 1:59
|Oklahoma City, Oklahoma, United States
| 
|-
| Win
|align=center| 2–0
|Ryan Dunphy
|Submission
|Masters of the Cage 14
|
|align=center| 1
|align=center| 1:50
|Oklahoma City, Oklahoma, United States
| 
|-
| Win
|align=center| 1–0
|Tony Roberts
|Decision (unanimous)
|Masters of the Cage 14
|
|align=center| 3
|align=center| 5:00
|Oklahoma City, Oklahoma, United States
|

References

External links
 

1982 births
Living people
American male mixed martial artists
Mixed martial artists from Oklahoma
Heavyweight mixed martial artists
People from Claremore, Oklahoma
People from Morris, Oklahoma
Sportspeople from Oklahoma City